

France
 Afars and Issas
 Commissioner – Georges Thiercy, High Commissioner of the Afars and Issas (1971–1974)
 Governing Council – Ali Aref Bourhan, President of the Governing Council (1967–1976)

Portugal
 Angola – 
 Camilo Augusto de Miranda Rebocho Vaz, High Commissioner of Angola (1966–1972)
 Fernando Augusto Santos e Castro, High Commissioner of Angola (1972–1974)

United Kingdom
 Hong Kong – 
Lord MacLehose of Beoch, Governor of Hong Kong (1971–1982)

Colonial governors
Colonial governors
1972